Ezequiel Sánchez (born 24 March 1949) is a Colombian weightlifter. He competed in the men's bantamweight event at the 1976 Summer Olympics.

References

External links
 

1949 births
Living people
Colombian male weightlifters
Olympic weightlifters of Colombia
Weightlifters at the 1976 Summer Olympics
Place of birth missing (living people)
20th-century Colombian people
21st-century Colombian people